The Association of Norwegian Editors (NR) is an interest group for editors and middle managers in the various Norwegian media. The organization is not a professional organization in the traditional sense, but it is intended to "protect freedom of expression and freedom of expression as the pillars of the rule of law and democracy."

The association was established in 1950 and has about 720 members. It is headquartered in Oslo. It is a member of the Norwegian Press Association.

The association's general secretary is Arne Jensen, who succeeded Nils E. Øy on September 1, 2013. Reidun Kjelling Nybø is the deputy general secretary.

Current board (2015–2017)
 Harald Stanghelle (chair), political editor for Aftenposten
 Hanna Relling Berg (vice chair), chief editor of Sunnmørsposten
 Hilde Garlid, chief editor of Jærbladet
 Thor Gjermund Eriksen, head of broadcasting at NRK
 Britt Sofie Hestvik, chief editor and CEO of Kommunal Rapport
 Kjersti Mo, chief editor for Egmont Publishing, Oslo
 Jan Ove Årsæther, news editor for TV2

Deputies
 Eirik Hoff Lysholm, chief editor and CEO of Dagsavisen 
 John Arne Moen, chief editor of Trønder-Avisa
 Espen Stensrud, chief editor of Autofil, Oslo
 Vibeke Madsen, news editor for Avisa Nordland
 Kristin Monstad, chief editor of Drammens Tidende

References

External links
 Official website

Norwegian journalism organisations
Professional associations based in Norway
Organizations established in 1950
Organisations based in Oslo